are cloth leggings which were worn by the samurai class and their retainers in feudal Japan. In Japanese, the word is also used for Western soldier's gaiters.

Description
 were worn as padding underneath the samurai greaves. Some types of  could be covered with mail armour ( or ); these were worn by foot soldiers or by samurai as protection.  were worn by ordinary travelers as protection from cold, insects and underbrush.

 were often made of linen, but other materials such as cotton were also used.  components depended on the season.

See also
 
 List of items traditionally worn in Japan

References

Sources
 Turnbull, Stephen (1998). The Samurai Sourcebook. London: Arms & Armour Press.  [reprinted by Cassell & Co., London, 2000.  ]

External links

Japanese clothing
Ninjutsu artefacts
Samurai clothing
Japanese words and phrases